Club Social, Cultural y Deportivo Brasilia is a football club based in Quinindé, Ecuador.

Brasilia
Association football clubs established in 1985
1985 establishments in Ecuador